Specific output is a measure of internal combustion engine performance. It describes the efficiency of an engine in terms of the brake horsepower it outputs relative to its displacement. The measure enables the comparison of differently sized engines, and is usually expressed as kilowatts or horsepower per litre or per cubic inch. On average, forced induction engines out-perform naturally aspirated engines by this measure, primarily due to their increased volumetric efficiency.

See also
 Power density
 List of automotive superlatives

References

Engine technology